Trachypepla semilauta is a moth of the family Oecophoridae and was first described by Alfred Philpott in 1918. It is endemic to New Zealand and has been collected in Southland. This species inhabits southern beech forest on the side of mountains. Adults are on the wing in January.

Taxonomy
This species was first described by Alfred Philpott in 1918 using three specimens collected in the Hunter Mountains in January. The male genitalia of this species was studied and illustrated by Alfred Philpott in 1927. George Hudson discussed and illustrated this species in his 1928 book The butterflies and moths of New Zealand. The female holotype is held in the New Zealand Arthropod Collection.

Description

Philpott described this species as follows:

This species can be distinguished from its close relative T. ingenua as it has a white patch on the basal portion of its forewings.

Distribution
This species is endemic to New Zealand. Philpott collected specimens at Cleughearn Peak in the Hunter Mountains at an altitude of approximately 825m.

Habitat

This species inhabits southern beech forests on the side of mountains.

Behaviour
Adults are on the wing in January.

References

Moths described in 1918
Oecophoridae
Taxa named by Alfred Philpott
Endemic fauna of New Zealand
Moths of New Zealand
Endemic moths of New Zealand